Rick Hansen Secondary School (RHSS) is a public high school located in the southeast corner of Streetsville, a community in Mississauga, Ontario. Rick Hansen is home to graduates from Fallingbrook Middle School, Fairwind Senior Public School, and Hazel McCallion Senior Public School. The school opened in 1999, and in 2002, the school expanded with a new wing on the west side of the school, which added 14 classrooms, 2 dance studios, and 2 art rooms. Nearly 2,000 students attend this school.

The school is a sister school to Rick Hansen Secondary School in Abbotsford, British Columbia and their mascot's name is stormy

History
When the school opened on September 7, 1999, it was named East Credit Secondary School, and it was one of the first schools where the administrative staff helped create the blueprint of the school. It was the first public high school to open in Peel in ten years. Names of many Canadian icons were suggested for the school, but the Peel District School Board chose Rick Hansen Secondary School. Rick Hansen granted permission to the Peel District School Board to use his name for the school, saying that he was "delighted that your school will be part of my heritage and to carry the history of the Man in Motion tour by being a barrier-free school." The school's architects implemented a wheelchair-friendly and barrier-free design by doing the following:
All floor tiles were in a special color scheme that assisted students with visual impairments
Disabled parking spots were relocated into a more accessible location
All furniture in every classroom was barrier-free
There was a specialized door system that made hallways fully accessible to students
Handles on all doors in the school were lowered for accessibility
Push buttons were installed in every drinking fountain
The library shelves were spaced enough for a wheelchair to go through
Disabled showers were realigned to better suit the use of students

In the first school year, there were 655 students and 53 staff members in the school. At the time, the school only taught ninth and tenth graders. The first two floors of the school were occupied by the ninth and tenth graders and the third floor was used by elementary school students, as the neighboring Swinbourne Public School was still under construction at the time.

In 2002, the school initiated the Rammed Earth project, which began as a vision of the school's arts department. The idea was to create three rammed earth sculptures in front of the school to bring art, culture, and community together. Students have worked together to blend 15 cubic yards of clay soil with cement, sand, and pigment. The students also hand tamped over a hundred layers of soil. They put a personal artifacts into the sculptures. This project was supported by the Ontario Arts Council, Toemar Garden Centre, Rona, and ABCO Construction Inc. The sculptures were removed after the 2011–2012 school year began.

Donations
Every year, students from Rick Hansen Secondary find new ways of collecting money for the Rick Hansen Foundation. The school collects a small amount of money from late students entering the school after the morning announcements have been completed. The school also has "Mad Minutes," where Peer Mentors run to every homeroom and collect as much loose change as possible from people's pockets in a short amount of time. The school also occasionally hosts many other activities, such as a coin drive, a school walk, pledge sheets, and a wheelchair basketball game at the school's gym.

Use of technology
Rick Hansen was built as Peel's first technically oriented school where students have the ability to work and learn in a 21st-century technological environment. There were televisions in every room in the school until the 2016–2017 school year, when all the classroom televisions were removed, and the school possesses more than twelve computer labs. The school also has its own BBS television channel powered by Digmark, an electronic signage provider. This BBS system allows announcements to be broadcast throughout the school in a PowerPoint presentation format to the school's televisions, with extras such as small breaking news updates, weather, and stock prices. There were also live morning broadcasts a couple times a month run by the broadcasting class. These broadcasts delivered morning announcements in a video format, and also showed the culture around the school by filming segments featuring students and staff bu,t with the removal of the classroom televisions, the school has resorted to oral announcements. There is Wi-Fi throughout the school building, providing wireless internet access to students.

FIRST Robotics Team
Rick Hansen's two FIRST Robotics Competition teams, known as THEORY6 and The Big Bang, have taken part in regional and worldwide competitions. THEORY6 started in 2003. They have won numerous awards, such as the Regional Chairman's Award in 2005 and 2012, and the Regional Engineering Inspiration Award in 2013. At the 2013 FIRST Championship, they earned the title of world champions along with two other teams: Team 610 (Crescent School) and Team 1477 (Texas Torque).

Extracurricular activities
Rick Hansen Secondary School has athletic and non-athletic clubs and organizations including:
Volleyball Sr. Boys undefeated regular season 
Basketball Sr. Boys 2013–2014 Champions
Archery Olympic Boys Regional and Provincial Team Champions 2014
Ball Hockey
Chess Ontario High School Chess Champions 2016 and 2017 - Beginner category
Cross Country Running
Track & Field
Tennis
Golf
Badminton
Table Tennis
Exposed Ink Magazine
Eco Club
 Computer Science Club
FIRST Robotics
DECA 
Yearbook Committee
Hansen For Humanity (Me to We club)
Improv Club
Band
Breakdancing Club
Science Club
Wrestling
STEM (Science, Technology, Engineering, Mathematics) Club
Student Activity Council
MHAC (Mental Health Awareness Club)
Drama Council
Boys Baseball  
Gender Equality Club
Girls Softball
Model UN
VEX Robotics 
Drama Council
Peer Mentors

Association with Rick Hansen
The school is named after Rick Hansen, an athlete who won all-star awards in five sports when he was paralyzed at the age of 15 after being thrown from the back of a truck. He subsequently became an athlete and an activist for people with spinal cord injuries. Rick Hansen has made many special visits to the school, and his most recent visit was on April 5, 2011, to celebrate the 25th anniversary of the Man in Motion World Tour. In the event, Hansen announced that a relay will take place to retrace the Canadian segment of the original Man in Motion Tour. The celebration was attended by many notable people, such as Hazel McCallion, the mayor of Mississauga, and David Onley, the Lieutenant Governor of Ontario. In total, 25 medal-bearers, including the school principal and a staff member, were chosen from the school. The Relay made its way through Rick Hansen on November 10, 2011.

See also
List of high schools in Ontario

References

External links
Theory6.ca - The website of Team 1241, the school's robotics team.
School Website Link - The school's official website.

Peel District School Board
High schools in Mississauga
Educational institutions established in 1999
1999 establishments in Ontario